Ceriani is a surname. Notable people with the surname include:

 Antonio Maria Ceriani (1828–1907), Italian prelate, Syriacist, and scholar
 Dylann Duncan Ceriani American former volleyball player
 Matt Ceriani (born 1981), Italian baseball player
 Warly Ceriani (1903–1983), classic Argentine actor